The Huaura Islands are an archipelago in Peru, comprising uninhabited islands and islets located in the Pacific Ocean.

Mazorca Island is the largest island of the group, reaching a maximum elevation of 78 m. There is also a lighthouse on the island.

Birds found on the islands include the guanay cormorant, the Peruvian booby and the Humboldt penguin.

Islands

References 

Pacific islands of Peru